Cat in a box or cat in the box may refer to:

 Schrödinger's cat, a thought experiment that puts a cat in a quantum superposition of alive and dead
 Cat in the Box Games, developers of Blue Defense: Second Wave!
 "Cat In A Box", a track on Morningwood's 2009 album Diamonds & Studs
 "Cat in the Box", a 2015 parody of Alice in Chains's song "Man in the Box"
 "Cat in a Box", a short story by Gareth L. Powell in his 2008 anthology The Last Reef and Other Stories
 The Cat in the Box, a 2019 book by researcher Chris Ferrie
 "Cat in the Box", a 2017 episode in the second season of Super Wings
 "Cat in the Box", a 2017 episode in season 2 of the TV series You Me Her
 Cat in the Box, an unreleased 1993 film by Valeria Golino
 Cat in the Box, an 2020 RPG Maker horror game created by Gustav and published by PsychoFlux Entertainment

See also
 Letting the cat out of the bag, to reveal facts previously hidden